The Gabba, also known as Brisbane Cricket Ground, is an Australian sports stadium located in the Brisbane, Queensland suburb of Woolloongabba. It was first used in 1895 and is the home ground of the Queensland cricket team. It has been used for international cricket since 1931 when the ground hosted its first Test match. The first One Day International at the ground was held in 1979 and in 2006, the ground hosted its first Twenty20 International match. Women's international cricket was first played on the ground in 1985.

In cricket, a five-wicket haul (also known as a "five-for" or "fifer") refers to a bowler taking five or more wickets in a single innings. This is regarded as a notable achievement. This article details the five-wicket hauls taken on the ground in official international Test and One Day International matches.
 
Two five-wicket hauls were taken during the first Test match played on the ground, both by Australian bowlers. Bert Ironmonger took five wickets for a cost of 42 runs (5/42) in South Africa's first innings of the match before his team-mate Tim Wall took 5/14 in their second innings. The best Test match bowling figures at the Gabba are the 9/52 taken by New Zealander Richard Hadlee in 1985, the only time that a bowler has taken nine wickets in an innings in international cricket on the ground. His innings bowling analysis was the fourth best in any Test match at the time and his match figures of 15/123 are the best in international cricket on the ground.

The first five-wicket haul in a One Day International match on the ground was taken by West Indian Anderson Cummins against India in 1992, when he took five wickets for 31 runs. The best ODI bowling figures at the venue are England's Chris Woakes' 6/56 taken against Australia in 2012.  no five-wicket hauls have bee taken in Twenty20 Internationals or in any form of women's international cricket on the ground.

Key

Test match five-wicket hauls

Five-wicket hauls have been taken 83 times in Test matches at the Gabba.

One Day International five-wicket hauls

Nine five-wicket hauls have been taken in men's ODIs on the ground.

Notes

References

External links 
International five-wicket hauls at the Gabba, CricInfo

G
Australian cricket lists
Cricket-related lists